Caldwell High School is a public high school located in the city of Caldwell, Texas (USA) and classified as a 3A school by the UIL. It is a part of the Caldwell Independent School District located in central Burleson County. Caldwell High School serves students in northern and western Burleson County, Texas.

Academics

Texas Education Agency Accountability Ratings
In 2015, Caldwell High School received a Texas Education Agency accountability rating of "Met Standard," and was awarded distinctions in the areas of Reading/ELA (English Language Arts), Mathematics, Science, and Post-Secondary Readiness.

In 2014, Caldwell High School received a Texas Education Agency accountability rating of "Met Standard," and was awarded distinctions in the areas of Reading/ELA, Mathematics, and Social Studies.

Athletics
The Caldwell Hornets compete in these sports - 

Baseball
Basketball
Cross Country
Football
Golf
Powerlifting
Softball
Tennis
Track and Field
Volleyball

State titles
Boys Track - 
1970(2A)
Volleyball - 
1985(1A), 1998(3A), 2000(3A)

Fine Arts

State titles
One Act Play - 
1980(2A), 1984(3A)

Notable alumni
 Kent Caperton, Texas State Senator
 Jason Carter, American football player, Carolina Panthers
 Charlie Krueger, American football player, San Francisco 49ers
 John Symank, American football player, Green Bay Packers and St. Louis Cardinals
 Kris Kocurek, American football player, coach Detroit Lions
 D. Lester Sheppard, Jr., Composer/Arranger
 Mel Deutsch, American baseball player, Boston Red Sox
 Sabine Lazo, American Equestrian

References

External links
 Caldwell Independent School District

Schools in Burleson County, Texas
Public high schools in Texas